Rafael Nadal defeated the defending champion Roger Federer in the final, 2–6, 6–4, 6–4 to win the men's singles tennis title at the 2006 Dubai Tennis Championships.

Seeds

Draw

Finals

Section 1

Section 2

External links
Draw
Qualifying Draw

2006 Dubai Tennis Championships
Dubai Tennis Championships